Rileyasuchus is  a genus of phytosaur from the Rhaetian (Late Triassic) Magnesian Conglomerate of England.  It has a confusing history, being associated with the taxonomy of Palaeosaurus and Thecodontosaurus, and being a replacement name for a preoccupied genus (Rileya, which had already been used by Ashmead, and Howard  both in 1888 for a hymenopteran).

History and taxonomy
Friedrich von Huene named the new genus for two vertebrae and a humerus from deposits in Bristol.  He had recognized it as a phytosaur by 1908 (by which point a few Palaeosaurus species had been added to the genus).

It seems to have sat unrecognized for most of the 20th century, except for 1961 when Oskar Kuhn renamed it from Rileya to Rileyasuchus. Adrian Hunt in 1994 (doctoral dissertation) first suggested that it was a herrerasaurid, although this was never published.  Benton et al. (2000) indicated that the type specimen was actually a chimera composed of a phytosaur humerus and Thecodontosaurus vertebrae. It is best regarded as a nomen dubium.

Paleobiology
As a phytosaur, it would have been a semi-aquatic crocodile-like predator.

References

External links
 Rileyasuchus as herrerasaurid

Phytosaurs
Late Triassic reptiles of Europe
Taxa named by Oskar Kuhn
Prehistoric reptile genera